Vincent Stochove or Vincent de Stochove (1610–1679) was a traveller best known for his French-language book Voyage du Levant describing his travels in the 1630s through The Levant, including Turkey, Syria, Palestine, and Egypt.

References

External links

French travel writers
1610 births
1679 deaths
French male non-fiction writers
French expatriates in the Ottoman Empire